Afghanistan women's national basketball team was formed by US troops after the invasion of Afghanistan in 2001. The Afghanistan women's national basketball team was run by the Afghan Olympic Committee.

See also
 Afghanistan men's national basketball team

External links
Presentation on Facebook

References

Women's national basketball teams
Basketball in Afghanistan
Basketball teams in Afghanistan
Basketball